Lunacharovka is a rural locality (a settlement) in Kiselinskoye Rural Settlement, Ternovsky District, Voronezh Oblast, Russia. The population was 81 as of 2010.

Geography 
Lunacharovka is located 50 km west of Ternovka (the district's administrative centre) by road. Dubrovka is the nearest rural locality.

References 

Rural localities in Ternovsky District